Saint-Pierre-d'Amilly is a commune in the Charente-Maritime department in southwestern France.

Geography

Places and monuments
 Church of St Paul, built in roughcast limestone in 1871, to replace two older churches that had been ruined by the wars that ravaged the region.
 The commune also has a war memorial, near the Church of St Paul.

Population

Economy
The commune is home to the Magernaud site of the National Institute for Agricultural Research (INRA), specialising in the improvement of aviculture (bird farming), heliciculture (snail farming) and apiculture (beekeeping).

See also
Communes of the Charente-Maritime department

References

Communes of Charente-Maritime